Kamron Samboonnanon  was a musician and actor born 7 January 1920, in Sampanthawong. Some dispute this, claiming he was born in Suphanburi after analyzing his accent. He graduated from Chang Korsang Utentawai School. He had many popular songs, such as Political mantra, Tasikumsorn, Oder Father, Life of farmhouse and more.

Kamron first came to prominence after performing "The Farmer's Bride" in a 1938 radio drama. This song has been largely considered the premier song in Thai country music and Kamron has been praised as "Father of Thai Country Music".

Kamron was outspoken against the establishment and the inequities of Thai politics which lead to his performances being halted by authorities and even lead to his arrest.

The height of his career was from 1946–1963. His popularity allowed him to lead a comfortable life. Later, he became addicted to drugs and eventually succumbed to them, passing away in 1969.

He published 139 songs in total, primarily dealing with politics, buddhism, and life of the poor working class. His style became the blueprint for modern Luk Thung.

References 

Kamron Samboonnanon
Kamron Samboonnanon
Kamron Samboonnanon
1920 births
1969 deaths